The governor of Ryazan Oblast is the highest official of Ryazan Oblast, a federal subject of Russia. The governor heads the executive branch in the region.

History of office 
The office of the Head of Administration of Ryazan Oblast was introduced on 25 September 1991 by the decree of the President of Russia Boris Yeltsin. Lev Poliyevktovich Bashmakov was appointed to the post, who already headed the region in 1988–90 as Chairman of the Executive Committee.

In December 1996, the first gubernatorial elections were held in the region. Member of the Communist Party Vyacheslav Lyubimov was the winner. The legislative election that followed a few months later also resulted in Communists' success, and Ryazan Oblast became a "red" region for the next 10 years.

In August 2002, amendments were made to the Charter of Ryazan Oblast: the post of "Head of Administration" was replaced by "Governor", who was also allowed to run for a third term. In 2012, the term of office was extended from four to five years.

List of officeholders

References 

Politics of Ryazan Oblast
 
Ryazan